The 2022 Harrow London Borough Council election took place on 5 May 2022. All 55 members of Harrow London Borough Council were elected. The elections took place alongside local elections in the other London boroughs and elections to local authorities across the United Kingdom.

The 2022 election took place under new election boundaries, which reduced the number of councillors to 55. In the previous election in 2018, the Labour Party maintained its control of the council, winning 35 out of the 63 seats with the Conservative Party as the council opposition with the remaining 28 seats. However, in the 2022 elections, the Conservative Party won control from Labour with net gains of 8 seats to gain a total of 31 seats.

Background

History 

The thirty-two London boroughs were established in 1965 by the London Government Act 1963. They are the principal authorities in Greater London and have responsibilities including education, housing, planning, highways, social services, libraries, recreation, waste, environmental health and revenue collection. Some of the powers are shared with the Greater London Authority, which also manages passenger transport, police and fire.

Since its formation, Harrow has been under Labour control, Conservative control and no overall control. The Labour Party most recently gained an overall majority on the council from no overall control in the 2014 election, winning 34 seats to the Conservatives' 26, with the Liberal Democrats winning one seat and independent candidates winning two. In the most recent election in 2018, Labour gained one seat to win 35 with 46.6% of the vote and the Conservatives gained two to win 28 seats with 45.1% of the vote. The Liberal Democrats received 6.4% of the vote across the borough and lost their only seat.

Council term 
Shortly after the 2018 election, a Labour group annual general meeting elected Graham Henson as group leader, defeating the incumbent Sachin Shah. Henson consequently became leader of the council. The former Conservative leader of the council and councillor for Pinner South, Chris Mote, died in July 2021. Mote had been a councillor in Harrow since 1982. A by-election to replace him was held in October 2021. The by-election was held for the Conservatives by the businessperson Hitesh Karia, with the Liberal Democrat candidate coming in second place. A councillor for Headstone South, Pamela Fitzpatrick, was expelled from the Labour Party in November 2021, which she said was for speaking to the Socialist Appeal newspaper.

As with most London boroughs, Harrow was electing its councillors under new boundaries decided by the Local Government Boundary Commission for England, which it produced after a period of consultation. The number of councillors fell by eight to 55, representing eleven three-councillor wards and eleven two-councillor wards.

Electoral process 
Harrow, like other London borough councils, elects all of its councillors at once every four years. The previous election took place in 2018. The election took place by multi-member first-past-the-post voting, with each ward being represented by two or three councillors. Electors had as many votes as there are councillors to be elected in their ward, with the top two or three being elected.

All registered electors (British, Irish, Commonwealth and European Union citizens) living in London aged 18 or over were entitled to vote in the election. People who live at two addresses in different councils, such as university students with different term-time and holiday addresses, were entitled to be registered for and vote in elections in both local authorities. Voting in-person at polling stations took place from 7:00 to 22:00 on election day, and voters were able to apply for postal votes or proxy votes in advance of the election.

Previous council composition

Overall results

Changes to 2018 election result

Ward results

4

References 

Council elections in the London Borough of Harrow
Harrow